Two Against Time is a 2002 American made-for-television drama film starring Marlo Thomas and Ellen Muth. It was written by Casey Kurtti and Peter Nelson and directed by David Anspaugh. The film was originally aired on CBS on April 4, 2002.

Plot
A mother and her daughter are, almost at same time, diagnosed with cancer. Now, the struggle against the illness will set them close and help them to overcome old antagonisms.

Cast
 Marlo Thomas as Julie Portman
 Ellen Muth as Emma Portman
 Peter Friedman as Robert Portman
 Karen Robinson as Connie Matthews
 Joe Penny as George Tomich
 Troy Hall as Michael Portman

Reception
Andy Webb from The Movie Scene gave the film three out of five stars, stating: "What this all boils down to is that I am still conflicted by "Two Against Time" because of the mix of heart-breaking and heart-warming which ends up causing the gritty drama to be softened. But it is a powerful story, powerfully acted and a movie which whilst may leave you as conflicted as I am, is well worth a watch." David Parkinson from Radio Times gave the movie only one out of five stars and wrote: "It's a cheap jibe to dismiss TV movies as "disease of the week" fodder. Unfortunately, this drama from director David Anspaugh ticks all the boxes. It's based on a true story and not only has two people battling against cancer, but, to make matters all the more lachrymose, they're a single mother and her rebellious teenage daughter." Steven Oxman from Variety magazine said about Two Against Time: "TV movies are dead, you know. They don't make them anymore. At least not the traditional ones. Admirably capable of exhausting a year's supply of tissues in a single sitting, "Two Against Time" will be a miracle cure for fans of this shamelessly sappy genre in its death throes." Tom Shales from The Washington Post criticized almost every aspect of the film, stating: "There have been many TV movies about the emotional and physical ravages of serious illness, most of them more sensitive than this one. Those who made "Two Against Time" imagine we've never seen any of those films and that hair loss from chemotherapy is going to come as a shock. There are worlds and worlds of difference between a lackluster movie like this and HBO's "Wit," in which Emma Thompson so memorably and unflinchingly played a terminal cancer patient."

References

External links
 

2002 television films
2002 films
2002 drama films
American drama television films
CBS network films
Films directed by David Anspaugh
Films scored by David Shire
Films about cancer
2000s American films
2000s English-language films